The Traffic Criminal Justice Unit is an Operational Command Unit  of the London Metropolitan Police, separate from the Traffic Operational Command Unit. The unit deals with all Met traffic prosecutions involving summonses. It also processes all fixed-penalty notices and penalty notices for disorder and runs safety-camera enforcement with the London Safety Camera Partnership.

History

In 2002 the Traffic Criminal Justice Unit was created. Primarily dealing with the processing of fixed penalties at that time, it has since developed into a fully functioning traffic prosecutions and collision investigation unit.

The unit’s current primary role is to provide a criminal justice function for all MPS (Metropolitan Police Service) traffic prosecutions involving summonses and investigating collisions, carrying out the work previously done by Borough traffic process units.

Role
There are six units within the TCJU.

Traffic criminal justice
Provides a Criminal Justice Unit function, which is the investigation of traffic collisions, arranging for witnesses of all Met traffic prosecutions to attend trials. When the evidence is collected and reviewed they then arrange for the summons to be issued.

Regional Criminal Justice Units and Serious Casework Unit
Responsible for over 100,000 traffic prosecutions each year  and the investigation of fatal and serious personal injury collisions. The Serious Casework Unit also investigates police collisions.

Parking and driver liability fixed penalty notices
Process all MPS fixed penalty notices for a broad range of traffic offences, such as obstruction, vehicle defects, speeding, no insurance and using a mobile phone whilst driving.

Penalty Notices for Disorder
Process all MPS penalty notices for disorder; these cover offences such as ‘drunk and disorderly’, minor criminal damage and more serious offences such as ‘causing harassment, alarm or distress’.

Safety Camera enforcement
Responsible for all stages of the operation of speed cameras and red light cameras from deployment to prosecution. About 360,00 offences are processed each year with most of those being dealt with by fixed penalties, although recently the LCSP has offered Safety Awareness Courses as an alternative to more minor offenders.

Warrant Unit
Following the non-appearance of defendants at court, arrest warrants are sometimes issued for the defendant to be brought before the court. This information is circulated to all Met officers by the warrant team. They also maintain a database of all persons disqualified from driving by the courts.

References

Traffic Criminal Justice Unit